Yackety Yack is a 1974 Australian film about the making of a film directed by Dave Jones. It stars Jones and John Flaus. David Stratton called it "the Hellzapoppin' of poor cinema, a frequently hilarious spoof on the low budget film... a sheer delight."

Plot
Maurice is an aspiring film director who talks about movie making with his friends, Steve, Zig and Caroline. He uses his power and edits out any statements that displease him. He asks opinion of a man on the street.

Maurice wants to commit suicide and analyses three famous suicides, Mishima, Socrates and Kirilov (a character in The Possessed). Maurice starts murdering the crew on his film before forcing Steve and Zig to assist his suicide.

Cast
Dave Jones as Maurice
John Flaus as Steve/himself
Peter Carmody as Zig
Peggy Cole as Caroline
John Cleary as building manager
Jerry Toeplitz as man in the street
Doug White as Socrates
Rod Nicholls as Kiriolov
Andy Miller as Mishima

Production
The film was heavily influenced by the work of Jean-Luc Godard. The script was originally written by Dave Jones in Montreal in 1970. Jones was an American who had worked in Hollywood before coming to teach at the Media Centre of La Trobe University in Australia in 1971.

The film was shot over five weeks in the evenings at the film studio at the university, using many staff and students of the film. It was finished at the end of 1972. Part of the budget came from the Experimental Film and Television Fund.

Release
The film screened at the Melbourne Co-op Cinema in mid September 1974.

References

External links
Yackety Yack at IMDb
Yackety Yack at National Film and Sound Archive
Yackety Yack at Oz Movies

1974 films
1970s Australian films
1970s English-language films